Pleasure and Pain may refer to:

Albums
 Pleasure & Pain (112 album), 2005
 Pleasure & Pain (T'Pau album), 2015
 Pleasure and Pain (Dr. Hook album), 1978
 Pleasure and Pain (Theatres des Vampires album), or the title song, 2005
 Pleasure and Pain, a 1992 album by Ben Harper and Tom Freund, or a 2002 DVD by Harper

Songs
 "Pleasure and Pain" (song), by the Divinyls, 1985
 "Pleasure and Pain", by Bullet for My Valentine from Fever, 2010

See also 
 Pain and pleasure, in philosophy
 Pain and Pleasure, a 1986 EP by Klinik